The Miss Florida USA competition is the pageant that selects the representative for the state of Florida in the Miss USA pageant.

Up until the 2017 pageant, both Miss and Teen state pageants were held separately in different months. In recent years, the organization was decided that both pageants would compete at the same time from 2018 onwards, just like the most of state pageants in the Miss USA system.

While Florida has had number of runners-up, finalists, and semi-finalists, the state has yet to win the Miss USA title. Although Cheryl Patton, who placed 2nd runner-up in Miss USA 1967, became Miss USA after Sylvia Hitchcock won Miss Universe. The most recent placement was Ashley Cariño placed 2nd runner-up in 2021.

Two former Miss Florida Teen USA titleholders have won this competition, and three titleholders have also competed at Miss America.

In 2019, contestant Madison Anderson (who finished first runner-up in that pageant) would go on to become Miss Universe Puerto Rico 2019, and then competed in Miss Universe 2019, placed first runner-up to Zozibini Tunzi of South Africa.  On 11 August 2022, contestant Ashley Cariño (who finished second runner-up at Miss USA 2021) was crowned Miss Universe Puerto Rico 2022 and will go on to compete for the title of Miss Universe 2022, later in the year.

The current titleholder is Taylor Fulford of Okeechobee and was crowned on May 29, 2022. She represented Florida for the title of Miss USA 2022.

Gallery of titleholders

Results summary

Placements
1st runners-up: Marcia Valibus (1958), Clo Cabrera (1987)
2nd runners-up: Nanita Greene (1959), Cheryl Patton (1967), Barbara Bowser (1980), Ashley Cariño (2021)
3rd runners-up: Connie Ensor (1972), Mary-Margaret Humes (1975), Monica Farrell (1988)
4th runners-up:  Nancy Wakefield (1960), Randy Beard (1966), Melissa Witek (2005), Cristin Duren (2006), Brittany Oldehoff (2014)
Top 5/6: Shannon Depuy (1995), Angelia Savage (1997), Génesis Dávila (2018)
Top 10/12:  Susan Aileen Deaton (1971), Stacy Evans (1973), Cynthia Zach (1974), April Shaw (1978), Kristen Berset (2004), Jessica Rafalowski (2008), Nicolette Jennings (2019)
Top 15/16/20: Kay Duggar (1953), Mariles Gessler (1955), Maria Junquera (1969), Cheryl Johnson (1970), Lissette Garcia (2011)

Florida holds a record of 29 placements at Miss USA.

Awards
Miss Photogenic: Shannon Ford (2002), Cristin Duren (2006)
Miss Congeniality: Linda LeFevre (1977)
Best State Costume: Nancy England (1963)

Winners 

Color key

Notes

References

External links
Official Website

Florida
Florida culture
Women in Florida
1952 establishments in Florida
Recurring events established in 1952
Annual events in Florida